Kounterfeit is a 1996 American direct-to-video crime/thriller film starring Bruce Payne and Hilary Swank. Kounterfeit was directed by John Mallory Asher and written by David Chase, Katherine Fugate and Jay Irwin.

Plot summary
A counterfeiter of money is attacked by two masked men and threatened to reveal where a certain amount of counterfeit money is. The counterfeiter pleads ignorance and is subsequently killed. Tommy 'Hopscotch' Hopkins, who has the money, learns of the death of the counterfeiter and begins to fear for his own safety. Consequently, he asks his friend, the street smart and "seasoned former criminal" Frankie (who owns a strip club), to assist him in an exchange of the fake money for real money which he has organised with some acquaintances. Frankie reluctantly agrees to assist his friend. During the exchange, an undercover police officer, Danny, is killed in a shootout. The shootout is witnessed by Danny's sister Colleen, who was hiding in the house. Distraught, she mistakenly believes that Frankie killed her brother. Colleen becomes frustrated with her ex-boyfriend, Vic, whose investigation into Danny's murder proceeds slowly, and decides to undertake her own investigation.

Main cast
 Hilary Swank as Colleen
 Bruce Payne as Frankie
 Corbin Bernsen as Marty Hopkins
 Mark-Paul Gosselaar as Paco/Danny
 Gil Bernardy as Counterfeiter
 Andrew Hawkes as Tommy 'Hopscotch' Hopkins
 Michael Gross as Captain Evans
 Rob Stewart as Vic
 Elizabeth Gracen as Bridgette
 Ben Foster as Travis
 Doug McKeon as Patron
 Jay Irwin as Contact 1
 Brad James as Contact 2

Bruce Payne and Elizabeth Gracen both played Immortals in the popular Highlander franchise.

Reception
The TV Guide website has given the film a rating of 2.5 out of 4. A reviewer for the TV Guide stated that 'Frankie's slablike features and seedy-cool demeanor initially makes him just one outsized thug among many, but Payne gradually warms up the protagonist and balances nicely against Hawkes's scenery-chewing Joe Pesci act'. Matt Spector stated that the film 'is enjoyable with enough action scenes and twists and turns to keep the audience interested'. A different reviewer stated that 'the ungainly script is low on both ideas and excitement'. Mick Martin and Marsha Porter described the film as a 'mildly diverting tale of two low life hoods'.
Dragan Antulov stated that 'the plot recycles many obligatory elements of low budget crime movies (vengeance as the prime motive for one of the protagonist, good guys who don't turn out so good at the end) and combines them with Tarantinoesque portrayal of small time criminals as protagonists'. VPRO Cinema awarded the film 3 out of 5 stars.
A reviewer for Film Review stated that 'Payne oozes charisma in a film which delivers plenty of cheap thrills but few surprises'.
Edmond Grant stated that the film's 'involved skullduggery holds few surprises in the end'. Joe Corey stated that the film 'seems like a cheap Miami Vice knock-off minus the golden talents of Philip Michael Thomas'. Nonetheless, Corey praised the acting of Hilary Swank, stating that she 'is the reason this film deserves to be seen' as 'she does her best to give life to a character that barely reads on the page' and 'seems very calm dealing with a script that over twists itself with the subterfuge'.

References

External links

1996 crime thriller films
1996 films
American crime thriller films
Counterfeit money in film
1990s English-language films
1990s American films